Al-Jāhiz is a crater on Mercury. It has a diameter of 83 kilometers. Its name was adopted by the International Astronomical Union (IAU) in 1976. Al-Jāhiz is named for the Arab writer Al-Jahiz, who died in Basra, Iraq, in 869 C.E.

Lu Hsun crater is southwest of Al-Jāhiz.

References

Impact craters on Mercury